Diphtherophorina is a suborder of terrestrial nematodes, being one of three that constitute suborder Triplonchida.

Taxonomy 
There is a single superfamily, the Diphtherophoroidea (formerly Trichodoiroidea (Thorne, 1935) Siddiqi, 1961), consisting of two families;
Diphtherophoridae
Trichodoridae

References

Bibliography 

De Ley, P & Blaxter, M 2004, 'A new system for Nematoda: combining morphological characters with molecular trees, and translating clades into ranks and taxa'. in R Cook & DJ Hunt (eds), Nematology Monographs and Perspectives. vol. 2, E.J. Brill, Leiden, pp. 633–653.

Enoplia
Protostome suborders